Footlight Varieties is the third of four titles in the RKO series of variety films, combining previously filmed shorts with new musical numbers, plus monologues by master of ceremonies Jack Paar. The new footage was directed by Hal Yates and written by Yates and Felix Adler.

In addition to Paar, the new footage includes performances by The Sportsmen quartet, Liberace, Jerry Murad's Harmonicats, Red Buttons, Grace Hartman, and flamenco dancer Inesita. The older sequences are taken from a Leon Errol two-reel comedy, a Flicker Flashbacks silent-movie revival, and a Frankie Carle musical short.

Footlight Varieties was followed by the fourth and final film in the variety-show series, Merry Mirthquakes, which received a limited release in 1953. Liberace appeared in new footage showcasing his piano performances, and he introduced three RKO comedy shorts.

References

RKO Pictures films
American black-and-white films
American musical films
1951 musical films
1951 films
1950s English-language films
1950s American films